The Faroe Islands competed at the 2004 Summer Paralympics in Athens, Greece. The islands' delegation consisted in a single athlete, Heidi Andreasen in swimming.

Medallists

Sports

Swimming

See also 
Faroe Islands at the Paralympics

References

Nations at the 2004 Summer Paralympics
2004
Paralympics